Wrong World is a 1985 Australian drama film directed by Ian Pringle and starring Richard Moir, Jo Kennedy, Nick Lathouris, Robbie McGregor, and Esben Storm. It was filmed in Nhill and Melbourne in Victoria, Australia.

Premise
David (Richard Moir), a disillusioned doctor, travels with a junkie female (Jo Kennedy) who has her own problems, across the state of Victoria.

Cast
Al Fahad Akash as Director
Richard Moir as David Trueman
Jo Kennedy as Mary
Nick Lathouris as Rangott
Robbie McGregor as Robert
Esben Storm as Lawrence
Tim Robertson as Psychiatrist

Production
The film was made with a grant of more than $100,000 from Film Victoria and an Australian Film Commission distribution guarantee.

Box office
Pringle struggled to find a distributor and wound up distributing the movie himself with a grant from the AFC. Wrong World grossed $17,213 at the box office in Australia.

Awards and nominations
At the 35th Berlin International Film Festival in 1985, the Silver Bear for Best Actress went to Jo Kennedy and Ian Pringle was nominated for a Golden Bear. At the AFI Awards Ray Argall was nominated in the Best Achievement in Cinematography category.

See also
Cinema of Australia

References

Further reading

External links

Wrong World at Oz Movies

1985 films
1985 drama films
Australian drama films
Films directed by Ian Pringle
1980s English-language films
1980s Australian films